The 1993 season was the second year of competitive football (soccer) in Lithuania as an independent nation since regaining independence from the Soviet Union in 1991.

National Leagues

A Lyga

1 Lyga

Lithuanian Cup

Final

National team

Senior team

Notes

External links
1993/1994 season on RSSSF
National Team Results
RSSSF Baltic Cup 1993